Gungbugh, is a small region of Srinagar city in Kashmir, situated on its outskirts. This place has been named Gungbugh due to a canal "Doodh Ganga" which passes nearby.

As of April 2015, the population was approximately 1500. Availability of fertile land and the presence of canal in its vicinity provides an opportunity to use the land for farming.most of the youth is employed in government & private sectors

Farming

Gungbugh is known for spinach farming.

Geography

References

Srinagar